Typhoon Hagibis, known in Japan as Typhoon No.19 or , was a large and costly tropical cyclone that caused widespread destruction in Japan. The typhoon raised global media attention, as it greatly affected the 2019 Rugby World Cup being hosted by Japan. Hagibis was also the deadliest typhoon to strike Japan since Typhoon Fran in 1976.

Hagibis developed from a tropical disturbance located a couple hundred miles north of the Marshall Islands on 2 October 2019. The Joint Typhoon Warning Center issued a red tropical cyclone formation alert - noting that the disturbance could undergo rapid intensification upon being identified as a tropical depression. On the next day, 3 October, both the Japan Meteorological Agency and the Joint Typhoon Warning Center began issuing advisories on Tropical Depression 20W. The depression stayed at the same intensity as it travelled west toward the Mariana Islands on 4 October, but on 5 October, 20W began undergoing rapid intensification and early that day, the system was issued with the name "Hagibis" by the JMA, which means speed in Filipino. Sea surface temperatures and wind shear became extremely favourable for tropical cyclogenesis and Hagibis started extremely rapid intensification on 6 October, and became a Category 5 super typhoon in under 12 hours - the second of the 2019 Pacific typhoon season. Edging closer to the uninhabited areas of the Mariana Islands, Hagibis displayed excellent convection as well as a well-defined circulation.

Land interaction did not affect Hagibis much, but as the system continued to move westward, it underwent an eyewall replacement cycle, which is usual for all tropical cyclones of a similar intensity. The inner eyewall was robbed of its needed moisture and Hagibis began to weaken, but the storm developed a large, cloud-filled eye, which then became clear, and Hagibis restrengthened to reach its second peak. Travelling toward Japan, Hagibis encountered high vertical wind shear and its inner eyewall began to degrade, and the outer eyewalls rapidly eroded as its center began to be exposed. On 12 October, Hagibis made landfall on Japan at 19:00 p.m JST (10:00 UTC) on the Izu Peninsula near Shizuoka. Then, an hour later at 20:00 p.m. JST, (11:00 UTC), Hagibis made its second landfall on Japan in the Greater Tokyo Area. On 13 October, Hagibis became an extratropical low and the JMA and JTWC issued their final advisories on the system. However, the extratropical remnant of Hagibis persistent for more than a week, before dissipating on 22 October. Hagibis caused catastrophic destruction across much of eastern Japan. Hagibis spawned a large tornado on 12 October, which struck the Ichihara area of Chiba Prefecture during the onset of Hagibis; the tornado, along with a 5.7 magnitude earthquake off the coast, caused additional damage those areas that were damaged by Hagibis. Hagibis caused $17.9 billion (2019 USD) in damages, making it the costliest typhoon on record.

Meteorological history

With favorable atmospheric conditions and warm sea surface temperatures prevailing, the Joint Typhoon Warning Center (JTWC) began noting the possibility of tropical cyclogenesis on 4 October, eventually issuing a Tropical Cyclone Formation Alert the next day. The system initially remained stationary, consolidating a center of circulation in the lower levels of the atmosphere. The Japan Meteorological Agency (JMA) declared the disturbance a tropical depression at 00:00 UTC on 5 October. A dominant curved rainband had begun to wrap around the center of Hagibis, signifying further organization. On 6 October, the storm made a slight turn towards the west-southwest and began an accelerated period of intensification within an environment with low wind shear and atop warm waters, reaching severe tropical storm intensity at 12:00 UTC and typhoon strength six hours later as it developed a small eye.

Typhoon Hagibis entered a period of explosive intensification on 7 October, with its central pressure falling 55 mbar (hPa; 1.62 inHg) in 12 hours according to the JMA. Estimates from the JTWC suggested a  increase in the storm's maximum winds in 22 hours. The rate of intensification was among the fastest observed in the Western Pacific.

After passing the Mariana Islands, Hagibis began an eyewall replacement cycle, which caused the rapid intensification phase to end. As the primary eyewall began to erode, the JTWC downgraded the typhoon to a Category 4-equivalent super typhoon at 00:00 UTC on 8 October. Hagibis began to weaken on 10 October, as sea surface temperatures decreased and wind shear increased. Mild strengthening was forecast shortly after Hagibis downgraded to a Category 3 typhoon, but this prediction failed to materialize, as the storm neared land and its outer rainbands began to erode.

While over Japan, Hagibis became disorganized from high wind shear and eventually became extratropical on 13 October. Afterward, the extratropical remnant of Hagibis accelerating northeastward, for the next few days. From 16 to 20 October, Hagibis made a counter-clockwise loop over the western Bering Sea, while gradually weakening. Afterward, the remnant of Hagibis drifted southwestward and then eastward, before dissipating on 22 October.

Preparations

Guam and the Northern Mariana Islands
Evacuation orders for Guam and the Mariana Islands were made on 7 October. U.S. president Donald Trump approved an emergency declaration for these islands ahead of Hagibis. The islands of Saipan, Tinian, Alamagan, and Pagan had been issued typhoon warnings.

Japan

Forecasts across eastern, western, and northern Japan called for strong winds and torrential rain that would likely cause flooding and mudslides. JR Group, Japan Airlines, and All Nippon Airways suspended services. JMA weather forecaster, Yasushi Kajiwara, said, "It is a level 5 situation; some sort of disaster may have already taken place. People are strongly advised to act to protect their lives right away." Evacuation orders have been issued to more than 800,000 households across 11 prefectures. Over 230,000 people took the advice to head to evacuation shelters.

The typhoon had effects on several major sporting events occurring in Japan. Three matches of the 2019 Rugby World Cup were cancelled due to Hagibis, including the Pool B matches between New Zealand and Italy, and Canada and Namibia, and the Pool C match between England and France. This marked the first time that matches have been cancelled in the history of the Rugby World Cup. All cancelled matches were counted as draws: the cancelled fixture effectively eliminated Italy from the tournament, as they had a chance to potentially qualify for the knockout stage with a sufficient margin of victory against New Zealand.

On 11 October, it was announced that the Saturday practice session for the 2019 Japanese Grand Prix at Suzuka Circuit would be cancelled, and the Saturday qualifying session was postponed to Sunday morning prior to the race. The F4 Japanese Championship cancelled its round at the circuit as well. Nippon Professional Baseball postponed both Game 4 Climax Series games in the 2019 Pacific League Climax Series and the 2019 Central League Climax Series, despite the games being played indoors in domed stadiums. Both games were planned to take place on Saturday, 12 October, one in Tokorozawa, Saitama, and the other in Bunkyō, Tokyo. The games were instead played the next day on Sunday, 13 October.

 The Belluna Dome, where the 2019 Pacific League Climax Series was being held, lacks a wall behind the stands despite being a closed roof stadium.

Impact

Guam and the Northern Mariana Islands
The Mariana Islands were glanced by Typhoon Hagibis. Acting Governor Arnold Palacios began giving "all-clear" signals based on information from the National Weather Service and CNMI Emergency Operations Center. Communities have been cleaning up debris and all evacuation centers are now closed. On 12 October, most utilities were restored and had started reopening.

Japan

Early on 12 October, a tornado struck Ichihara City, which killed one person and left two people injured. In the afternoon, some areas of Japan suffered heavy flooding, with tens of thousands of homes without power. The Japan Meteorological Agency warned that high winds could cause further flooding and landslides. The agency issued evacuation advisories in high-risk areas. Over  of rain fell in parts of Japan. Japan's Fire and Disaster Management Agency stated that at least 98 people have been confirmed dead, 7 people are missing, with 346 people injured by the storm. More than 270,000 households lost power across the country. Ten trains of the Hokuriku Shinkansen Line in Nagano City were inundated by flood waters, leading to a loss of ¥32.8 billion (US$300 million). Economic losses throughout the nation are estimated to be US$15 billion, and insured losses are estimated at US$9 billion.

At around 6:22 p.m. JST (09:22 UTC) on 12 October, a magnitude 5.7 earthquake occurred off the coast of Chiba Prefecture, worsening the dangerous conditions already created by Hagibis.

Qualifying for the Grand Prix was rescheduled to the Sunday morning before the race.

Retirement
Due to the severe impacts of Typhoon Hagibis in Japan, the name Hagibis was officially retired during the 52nd Annual Session, organized by the ESCAP/WMO Typhoon Committee in February 2020. In February 2021, the Typhoon Committee subsequently chose Ragasa as its replacement name.

See also 

 Weather of 2019
 Tropical cyclones in 2019
 Typhoon Ida (1958)
 Typhoon Francisco (2013)
 Typhoon Jebi (2018) – The costliest typhoon on record in Japan, in terms of insured losses
 Typhoon Yutu (2018)
 Typhoon Faxai (2019)
 Typhoon Tip (1979) - The largest and most intense tropical cyclone and was similar to Hagibis in size and path.

References

External links

Japan Meteorological Agency's website
Joint Typhoon Warning Center's website

2019 Pacific typhoon season
October 2019 events in Asia
October 2019 events in Oceania
2019 in Japan
Typhoons in Japan
2019 in Guam
2019 in the Northern Mariana Islands
Hagibis